Mu Aurigae, Latinized as μ Aurigae, is the Bayer designation for an unconfirmed binary star in the northern constellation of Auriga. It is visible to the naked eye with an apparent visual magnitude of +4.88.

This is an A-type main-sequence star with a stellar classification of A4 Vm; the 'm' suffix indicating that abnormal abundances of heavier elements appear in the star's spectrum, making this an Am star.

A very close companion has been reported using speckle interferometry, but this remains unconfirmed. It was catalogued by Hipparcos as a problem binary, indicating that the measurements of its position were not consistent with the motion of a single star, but no satisfactory orbit could be found to match the motion

Name

This star, along with λ Aur and ρ Aur, were Kazwini's Al Ḣibāʽ (ألحباع), the Tent. According to the catalogue of stars in the Technical Memorandum 33-507 - A Reduced Star Catalog Containing 537 Named Stars, Al Ḣibāʽ were the title for three stars: λ Aur as Al Ḣibāʽ I, μ Aur as Al Ḣibāʽ II and σ Aur as Al Ḣibāʽ III.

References

External links
 HR 1689
 Image Mu Aurigae

A-type main-sequence stars
Aurigae, Mu
Auriga (constellation)
BD+38 1063
Aurigae, 11
033641
024340
1689
Am stars
Binary stars